Beth A. Rubino is an American film production designer and set decorator. She has been nominated for the Academy Award for Best Art Direction twice for her set decoration: in 1999 for The Cider House Rules and in 2008 for American Gangster. She was also nominated for an Emmy award for her production design on "American Horror Story". Other notable films include Analyze That and Something's Gotta Give.

Selected filmography
 1993- Super Mario Bros.
 1993- Romeo is Bleeding
 1994- Baby's Day Out
 1994- Terminal Velocity
 1995- Money Train
 1996- Sleepers
 1997- Jungle 2 Jungle
 1998- Twilight
 1999- The Cider House Rules  Academy Award nomination
 2001- Original Sin
 2002- Analyze That
 2003- Something's Gotta Give
 2005- The Interpreter
 2006- World Trade Center
 2007- American Gangster  Academy Award nomination
 2009- It's Complicated
 2011- American Horror Story  'Emmy nomination
 2014- Clementine
 2015- The Intern
 2015- Love The Coopers
 2015-2016- Quantico
 2017- The Upside
 2018- The Rookie
 2018- Midnight Texas
 2018- Tremors
 2019-2020- God Friended Me
 2021-2022- The Equalizer

Personal Views
In discussing designing a home versus a movie set, Rubino says "In a regular residence, you’re creating the top layer of their environment; in a movie we do that but create subtext as well."

References

External links 
 

American art directors
Living people
Year of birth missing (living people)